The Alphonse Gaulin Jr. House is an historic house in Woonsocket, Rhode Island.  The -story wood-frame house was built c. 1885 by Alphonse Gaulin Jr.,  one of the city's first wealthy French-Canadian residents and its mayor 1903–05.  The house is one of the city's finest Queen Anne Victorians, exhibiting the asymmetrical massing, varying projections, and a square tower projecting diagonally from one corner.

The house was listed on the National Register of Historic Places in 1982.

See also
National Register of Historic Places listings in Providence County, Rhode Island

References

Houses completed in 1885
Houses on the National Register of Historic Places in Rhode Island
Houses in Woonsocket, Rhode Island
National Register of Historic Places in Providence County, Rhode Island